Samotherium ("beast of Samos") is an extinct genus of Giraffidae from the Miocene and Pliocene of Eurasia and Africa. Samotherium had two ossicones on its head, and long legs. The ossicones usually pointed upward, and were curved backwards, with males having larger, more curved ossicones, though in the Chinese species, S. sinense, the straight ossicones point laterally, not upwards. The genus is closely related to Shansitherium.  Fossil evidence suggests that Samotherium had a rounded muzzle, which would suggest a grazing lifestyle and a habitat composed of grassland. One common predator of this animal was the Amphimachairodus.

According to biologist Richard Ellis the skull of a Samotherium is portrayed on an ancient Greek vase as a monster that Heracles is fighting.

Description

 
A 2015 study found that Samotherium had a neck intermediate in length between the giraffe and the okapi, judging from examination of specimens of S. major from Greece.

References

Prehistoric giraffes
Miocene even-toed ungulates
Pliocene even-toed ungulates
Neogene mammals of Asia
Prehistoric even-toed ungulate genera
Transitional fossils